Do Dong-hyun (born 19 November 1993) is a South Korean professional footballer who plays mainly as left winger but can also play as an attacking midfielder. He currently plays for Jinju Citizen FC.

Club career

Brisbane Roar
Do signed a three-year deal with Australian A-League club Brisbane Roar on 17 July 2012, making him the youngest player to occupy a Visa spot in the A-League. He never made as a club starter during his season debut and only made 3 appearances as a substitute. For some bitter reason, Do could not continue with the side and was released from the club in July 2013.

FC Gifu
On 17 July 2013, Do signed for J2 League team FC Gifu, where he made 5 appearances for the team.

NorthEast United
Dong-Hyun was drafted by NorthEast United in the Inaugural Indian Super League draft on 21 August 2014.

East Bengal
On 27 June 2015, Do signed a one-year contract with an I-League Kolkata based club East Bengal for the 2015–16 I-League season. The club is under newly appointed East Bengal coach Biswajit Bhattacharya.

Do started the season in the 2015 Calcutta Football League where he scored 12 goals in 10 appearances, helping his team to clinch the title, including a brace in the 4–0 derby win over Mohun Bagan where he scored 2 goals both from a free kick.

He made his I-League debut for East Bengal on 10 January 2016 and recorded an assist in East Bengal's 3–1 win over Sporting Club de Goa.
He also played an important role in the return league of 2015–16 I-League in the match against arch rivals Mohun Bagan as he scored two goals one from a spot-kick and the other one by dancing past two defenders at Kanchenjunga Stadium of Siliguri.

On 17 November 2016 it was announced that Do had been released by East Bengal after failing to impress head coach Trevor Morgan.

UiTM
On 11 January 2017, Do signed a one-year contract with Malaysian Liga Premier side UiTM. He made his Liga Premier debut in a 1–1 draw against Kuala Lumpur on 3 February 2017. Do made 29 appearances and 16 goals during his debut season with UiTM. On 24 November 2017, Do had already been offered a contract extension to stay with the club but he has refused.

Kelantan
On 23 November 2017, Do signed a two-year contract with the Malaysian Malaysia Super League side Kelantan. Do made his league debut for Kelantan in 2–1 defeat to Melaka United on 3 February 2018. On 6 February 2018, Do scored his first goal for Kelantan in a 1–1 draw against Terengganu. Do scored a hatrick in 3–2 win over Perak on 24 February 2018 at Sultan Muhammad IV Stadium.

Terengganu
After being frozen out of the Kelantan first team as a result of new head coach Fajr Ibrahim reshuffling of the team, Do signed with rivals Terengganu F.C. II until the end of the 2018 season.

Gyeongnam FC
In 2019, Dong-hyun joined K League 1 side Gyeongnam FC.

Jinju Citizen FC
In 2022 season, he joined K4 League side Jinju Citizen FC for his military service as a social service agent.

International career
Do made 2 appearances for South Korea U20 in 2012 AFC U-19 Championship qualification. His debut was in 1–0 defeat against Thailand U20 on 31 October 2011. Do scored a hat trick in an 18–0 win over Guam U20 on 2 November 2011.

Career statistics

Club

Honours
Individual
 East Bengal "Player of the Season Award": 2016

References

External links 

Do Dong-hyun at National Team stats at KFA 

Living people
1993 births
South Korean footballers
South Korean expatriate footballers
Brisbane Roar FC players
A-League Men players
J2 League players
I-League players
K League 1 players
K League 2 players
K4 League players
FC Gifu players
NorthEast United FC players
Indian Super League players
East Bengal Club players
UiTM FC players
Kelantan FA players
Gyeongnam FC players
South Korean expatriate sportspeople in Australia
Expatriate soccer players in Australia
South Korean expatriate sportspeople in Japan
Expatriate footballers in Japan
South Korean expatriate sportspeople in India
South Korean expatriate sportspeople in Malaysia
Expatriate footballers in India
South Korea under-20 international footballers
Association football wingers
Association football forwards
Calcutta Football League players